The Augusta Chronicle is the daily newspaper of Augusta, Georgia, and is one of the oldest newspapers in the United States still in publication. The paper is known for its coverage of the Masters Tournament, which is played in Augusta. The Chronicle had a daily circulation of 18,177 and a Sunday circulation of 21,166 according to Dec 2018 Quarterly Data Report by the Alliance for Audited Media.

History
[[File:News Building, Augusta, GA May 2017.jpg|thumb|The Augusta Chronicle'''s headquarters in the News Building on Broad Street]]
The paper was founded as the weekly Augusta Gazette in 1785. In 1786, the paper was renamed The Georgia State Gazette.  From 1789 to 1804, the paper was known as The Augusta Chronicle and Gazette of the State. Patrick Walsh, later a U.S. Senator, joined the editorial staff in 1866 and became owner in 1873.

In 1945, former bookkeeper William Morris, Jr. bought controlling interest in the paper. This was the beginning of Morris Communications, headquartered in Augusta with the Chronicle as flagship.

In addition to a daily online edition, the entire archives back to its founding have been made searchable on the Internet.

On 9 August 2017, it was announced that The Augusta Chronicle, along with Morris Communications' entire newspaper division and various periodicals, would be sold to GateHouse Media for $120 million in a deal expected to close on October 2. Stephen Wade and Billy Morris will retain their roles as president and publisher respectively. The Morris family will keep ownership of The Augusta Chronicle building and property in downtown Augusta. The sale ended 232 years of local ownership, the last 72 of which had been under the Morris family.

Subsidiaries
Newspapers published by the Chronicle include The Columbia County News-Times, The Hampton County Guardian, The Jefferson News-Farmer, and the Sylvania Telephone''.

See also

Media in Augusta, Georgia
 List of newspapers in Georgia (U.S. state)

References

Further reading
 Earl L. Bell and Kenneth C. Crabbe, The Augusta Chronicle: Indomitable Voice of Dixie, 1785-1960 (Athens: University of Georgia Press, 1960).

External links
 The Augusta Chronicle official site
 The Augusta Chronicle official mobile site
 
 Morris subsidiary profile of The Augusta Chronicle
 https://www.facebook.com/TheAugustaChronicle
 https://twitter.com/AUG_Chronicle
 https://www.instagram.com/aug_chronicle/
 https://abcas3.auditedmedia.com/MICenter/Home/Index?s=8ed040c9-0ce3-46b6-aff2-fcfcaf314b53#://abcas3.auditedmedia.com/pfc/default.aspx/

Newspapers published in Georgia (U.S. state)
Gannett publications
Mass media in Augusta, Georgia
Newspapers established in 1785
1785 establishments in Georgia (U.S. state)